March 2017

See also

References 

 03
March 2017 events in the United States